Calamus State Recreation Area is a state park in central Nebraska, United States. The recreation area includes and surrounds the Calamus Reservoir. The recreation area is managed by the Nebraska Game and Parks Commission.

See also
Nebraska Game and Parks Commission

External links
 Calamus State Recreation Area
 Nebraska Game and Parks Commission

Protected areas of Nebraska
State parks of Nebraska